Isohexanol (IUPAC name: 4-methylpentan-1-ol; also called isohexyl alcohol or 4-methyl-1-pentanol) is an organic chemical compound. It is found in longan fruit.

References 

Hexanols